Plaster casting may refer to:

Plaster cast
Plaster mold casting, a metalworking process that uses plaster as the mold material